Eagle Point National Cemetery is a United States National Cemetery located just east of Eagle Point, Jackson County, Oregon and about  northeast of Medford. Administered by the United States Department of Veterans Affairs, it encompasses , and as of 2021, had over 25,000 interments.

History 
Cypress Hills National Cemetery opened in 1952 to service the nearby veterans facility in White City, Oregon about four miles away. Administration was transferred to the National Cemetery system in 1973, when it was named White City National Cemetery. The name was changed to Eagle Point National Cemetery on March 19, 1985.

Noteworthy monuments 
 A memorial dedicated to "All Unknown Veterans" was erected at the cemetery in 1980, it was donated by the Disabled American Veterans organization.
 A carillon was donated by the American Veterans as part of their international living-memorial program, which began shortly after World War II.
 A memorial dedicated to all 1st Marine Divisions of all Wars was donated by the 1st Marine Division Association.

Notable interments 
 USN Lieutenant George Ray Tweed (1902–1989) – World War II veteran who hid for two and a half years following the Battle of Guam, evading capture and supplying information to the US forces in the Pacific. He wrote Robinson Crusoe, USN which inspired the movie No Man Is an Island.
 Charlene Pryer (1921–1999) – World War II veteran and All-American Girls Professional Baseball League player

See also

 National Register of Historic Places listings in Jackson County, Oregon

References

External links
 National Cemetery Administration
 Eagle Point National Cemetery
 
 
 

1952 establishments in Oregon
Cemeteries on the National Register of Historic Places in Oregon
Eagle Point, Oregon
Historic American Landscapes Survey in Oregon
National Register of Historic Places in Jackson County, Oregon
Protected areas of Jackson County, Oregon
United States national cemeteries